The 1988 Five Nations Championship was the 59th series of the rugby union Five Nations Championship. Including the previous incarnations as the Home Nations and Five Nations, this was the ninety–fourth series of the northern hemisphere rugby union championship. Ten matches were played over five weekends between 16 January and 19 March. Wales and France were declared joint winners with six points each; it was the most recent time the Championship was shared between two or more nations as the rules were changed in 1994 to make such an event unlikely.

The final match of the tournament, England's victory over Ireland, was notable for the crowd bursting into song with "Swing Low, Sweet Chariot" as a response to the hat-trick of tries scored by England's Chris Oti (only the second black player, and the first for 80 years, to be capped by England). The song was subsequently to become the unofficial rugby anthem for England.

Wales missed out on a ninth Grand Slam after losing to France at Cardiff Arms Park.

Participants
The teams involved were:

Squads

Table

Results

Round 1

Round 2

Round 3

Round 4

Round 5

References

External links
1988 Five Nations Championship at ESPN

Six Nations Championship seasons
Five Nations
Five Nations
Five Nations
Five Nations
Five Nations
Five Nations
 
Five Nations
Five Nations
Five Nations